The Mailuan or Cloudy Bay languages are a small family of Trans–New Guinea languages spoken around Cloudy Bay in the "Bird's Tail" (southeastern peninsula) of New Guinea. They are classified within the Southeast Papuan branch of Trans–New Guinea.

Languages
The languages, which all share about half of their vocabulary, are,
Domu, Binahari–Binahari-Ma, Morawa, Mailu (Magi), Laua

Bauwaki–O'oku is closely related to the Mailuan languages.

Classification
Dutton (1971) said Bauwaki was a link to the Yareban languages. It has greater lexical similarity with Aneme Wake (Yareban) than the closest Mailuan language, Domu. Usher (2020) classifies Mailuan, Bauwaki and Yareban together.

Magi shows evidence of language shift from an Oceanic language in many Oceanic words.

Pronouns
Usher (2020) reconstructs the proto-Mailuan–Yareban pronouns as:

{| 
! !!sg!!du!!pl
|-
!1excl
|rowspan=2|*na || ||*ge
|-
!1incl
|*gu||*i
|-
!2
|*ga|| ||*ja
|-
!3
|*e|| ||*ema
|}

Ross (1995) reconstructs the Mailuan pronouns as:

{| 
! !!sg!!du!!pl
|-
!1
|*i||*gu-||*ge
|-
!2
|*ga||*[j]a||*[j]a, *mee
|-
!3
| ||*emu
|}

Vocabulary comparison

The following basic vocabulary words are from Thomson (1975) and various SIL field notes, as cited in the Trans-New Guinea database:

Additional word lists can be found in Ray (1938).

Evolution
Mailuan reflexes of proto-Trans-New Guinea (pTNG) etyma are:

Mailu language:
ama ‘breast’ < *amu
maa ‘mouth’ < *maŋgat[a]
kisa ‘bone’ < *kondaC
tupa ‘short’ < *tu(p,mb)a(C)
guia ‘cassowary’ < *ku(y)a

Bauwaki language:
baba ‘father’ < *mbapa
idi ‘hair’ < *iti[C]
(ine) ibi ‘name’ < *imbi
iini- ‘sleep’ < *kin(i,u)-

References

 

 
Mailu–Yareban languages
Languages of Central Province (Papua New Guinea)